In the elections to the Florida State Senate that were held on November 6, 2018, 20 of the 40 seats were contested in regular elections and two seats in special elections. The winners of the 20 regular elections will serve four year terms from November 6, 2018 to November 6, 2022, and the winners of the two special elections will serve two year terms from November 6, 2018 to November 6, 2020.



Results summary

Statewide

Retiring Incumbents
(There were no Democrats term limited from their seats)
Dorothy Hukill District 14 (Retiring, later deceased)
Jack Latvala District 16 (term limited, resigned due to sexual harassment allegations)
Greg Steube District 23 (retiring, ran for CD-17)
Joe Negron District 25 (term limited)
Denise Grimsley District 26 (retiring, ran for Agricultural Commissioner
Rene Garcia District 36 (term limited)

Districts

Closest races 
Seats where the margin of victory was under 10%:
  gain

District 2 

District 2 consists of Bay, Holmes, Jackson, Walton, Washington, and part of Okaloosa counties. Incumbent George Gainer was re-elected by a margin of 51 percent.

Republican primary 

Incumbent George Gainer won the primary unopposed.

Democratic primary 

Attorney Gigi Gibson won the primary unopposed.

General election

Predictions 

MCI Maps gave the second district a rating of "Safe GOP".

Results

District 4 

District 4 consists of Nassau and part of Duval counties. Incumbent Aaron Bean was re-elected by a margin of 29 percent.

Republican primary 
Incumbent Republican Aaron Bean defeated challenger Carlos E. Slay in the Republican primary by a margin of 75 percent.

Candidates 

 Aaron Bean, incumbent Florida Senator since 2012
 Carlos E. Slay, former Nassau County tax collector candidate

Primary results

General election

Results

District 6 

District 6 consists of part of Duval county. Incumbent Audrey Gibson was re-elected unopposed.

District 8 

District 8 consists of Alachua, Putnam, and part of Marion counties. Incumbent Keith Perry was re-elected by a margin of one percent.

General election

Results

District 10 

District 10 consists of Citrus, Hernando and part of Pasco counties. Incumbent Wilton Simpson was re-elected by a margin of 30 percent.

General election

Results

District 12 

District 12 consists of Sumter, and parts of Lake, and Marion counties. Incumbent Dennis Baxley was re-elected by a margin of 31 percent.

General election

Results

District 14 

District 14 consists of parts of Brevard and Volusia counties. Incumbent state senator Dorothy Hukill, Republican, died in October 2018 due to cervical cancer. As her name was already printed on ballots, votes cast for her were counted for Tom A. Wright, the Republican nominee, who won the election by a margin of 13 percent.

General election

Results

District 16 

District 16 consists of parts of Pasco and Pinellas counties.

Republican primary

Candidates 

 Ed Hooper, former Florida Representative and Deputy Whip from 2006 to 2014
 Leo Karruli, entrepreneur

Results

General election

Results

District 18 

District 18 consists of part of Hillsborough county.

General election

Results

District 20 

District 20 consists of parts of Hillsborough, Pasco, and Polk counties.

Republican primary

Candidates 

 Tom Lee, incumbent Senator since 2012 and from 1996 to 2006, former Senate President from 2004 to 2006
 John Manners Houman, Republican nominee for Florida Senate in 2016

Results

General election

Results

District 22 

District 22 consists of parts of Lake and Polk counties.

General election

Results

District 23 

District 23 consists of Sarasota and part of Charlotte counties. An election for this district was not scheduled to occur until the 2020 general elections, but a special election was scheduled concurrent with the 2018 general elections due to a vacancy that occurred as a result of the resignation of then-state senator Greg Steube to run for the United States House of Representatives.

General election

Results

District 24 

District 24 consists of part of Pinellas county.

General election

Results

District 25 

District 25 consists of Martin, St. Lucie and part of Palm Beach counties. An election for this district was not scheduled to occur until the 2020 general elections, but a special election was scheduled concurrent with the 2018 general elections due to a vacancy that occurred as a result of the resignation of former Senate President Joe Negron.

Republican primary

Candidates 

 Gayle Harrell, Florida Representative since 2012
 Belinda Keiser, former member of Florida Constitution Revision Commission, delegate to the 2016 Republican National Convention

General election

Results

District 26 

District 26 consists of DeSoto, Glades, Hardee, Highlands, Okeechobee, and parts of Charlotte, Lee, and Polk counties.

General election

Results

District 28 

District 28 consists of Collier, Hendry and part of Lee counties.

General election

Results

District 30 

District 30 consists of part of Palm Beach county.

General election

Results

District 32 

District 32 consists of part of Broward county.
Incumbent Lauren Book was elected unposed both in the primary and general election.

District 34 

District 34 consists of part of Broward county.

General election

Results

District 36 

District 36 consists of part of Miami-Dade county.

General election

Results

District 38 

District 38 consists of part of Miami-Dade county.
Democrat Jason Pizzo beat incumbent Daphne Campbell in the democratic primary, 54%-46%. The general election was cancelled meaning Pizzo was the victor of the race.

District 40 

District 40 consists of part of Miami-Dade county.

General election

Results

Notes

References 

Florida Senate elections
Senate
Florida Senate